Degtyarnoye is a rural locality (a selo) and the administrative center of Degtyarenskoye Rural Settlement, Kamensky District, Voronezh Oblast, Russia. The population was 406 as of 2010. There are 6 streets.

Geography 
Degtyarnoye is located 17 km southwest of Kamenka (the district's administrative centre) by road. Khvoshchevaty is the nearest rural locality.

References 

Rural localities in Kamensky District, Voronezh Oblast